The following is a list of various types of marble according to location.

(NB: Marble-like stone which is not true marble according to geologists is included, but is indicated by italics with geologic classification given as footnote.

Africa

Egypt
Galala Marble
Sinai Pearl Marble
Milly Grey Marble
Sunny Marble
Alabaster Marble

Ethiopia
 Daleti marble, Western Welega: white, white with grey veins and other colours
 Enda Tikurir marble, Western Tigray
 Newi marble, Central Tigray
 Akmara marble, Central Tigray
 Dichinamo marble, Western Tigray

Tunisia
 Giallo antico — also known as Numidian marble (marmor numidicum in Latin), was a yellow marble quarried in Roman times from the area of Chemtou, ancient Simmithu

Asia

China 
Hàn Bái Yǜ Marable (Chinese: 汉白玉) A type of white marble used in China for building and sculpting.

India
Makrana Marble

Europe

Belgium
 Noir Belge
 Griotte

Czech Republic 

 Český Šternberk marble (šternberský mramor) from Český Šternberk, Benešov District: white</ref>
 Pernštejn marble (pernštejnský mramor) from Nedvědice, Brno-Country District: white
 Nehodiv marble (nehodivský mramor) from Nehodiv, Klatovy District: grey
 Lipová marble (lipovský mramor) from Horní Lipová, Jeseník District: dark and light-coloured
 Sněžník marble (sněžníkovský mramor) from Horní Morava, Ústí nad Orlicí District: light-coloured
 Supíkovice marble (supíkovický mramor) from Supíkovice, Jeseník District: grey-white

Marble mis-nomers:
 Cetechovice marble (cetechovický mramor) from Cetechovice, Kroměříž District: coloured
 Karlík marble (karlický mramor), from Barrandien, Karlík, Prague-West District: black with gold-yellow-colour veins
 Podol marble (Podolský mramor), from Vápenný Podol, Chrudim District: white, grey-white, rosy
 Křtiny marble (křtinský mramor) from Křtiny, Blansko District: grey, rosy, reddish
 Slivenec marble (slivenecký mramor), from Barrandien, Slivenec and Radotín (Cikánka, Horní Kopanina, Na Špičce, Hvížďalka quarries), Prague: reddish, rose, brown, grey, spotted with veins

France
 Griotte

Germany
 Auerbach marble
 Crottendorf marble
 Saalburg violet
 Wunsiedel Marble

Greece

 Green of Styra or Styron Evia Green, near Styra on the island Euboea (silicate marble)
 Hymettus marble
 Parian marble
 Pentelic marble
 Skyros breccia
 Thassos marble
 Portosanta marble

Ireland
 Connemara marble, a serpentine marble
 Kilkenny marble

Italy
 Arabescato marble
 Calacata marble 
 Carrara marble
 Candoglia marble
 Lasa marble
 Red Verona marble
 Rosso di Levanto marble
 Siena marble

North Macedonia
 Sivec (Bianco Sivec)

Norway
 Fauske marble

Poland
 Marianna marble or Krzyżnik, marble from the Śnieżnik Mountains near Stronie Śląskie

Portugal
 Rosa aurora marble

Romania
 Bucova marble
 Rușchița marble

Russia
 Ruskeala

Spain
 Crema Marfil
 Macael marble
 Negro Marquina
 Veteado Rio
 Emperador
 Negro Fantasia
 Saltador

Sweden
 Swedish green marble
 Ekeberg marble

Turkey
 Prokonnesos marble
 Pavonazzo marble

United Kingdom
 Ashford Black Marble
 Cotham Marble
 Dent Marble
 Purbeck Marble
 Sussex Marble
 Iona marble

North America

United States

 Cockeysville marble
 Creole marble
 Etowah marble
 Murphy marble
 Potomac marble
 St. Genevieve marble
 Sylacauga marble
 Tennessee marble
 Tuckahoe marble
 Vermont marble
 Yule marble

Oceania

New Zealand
Tākaka Marble

See also

 List of types of limestone
 List of sandstones

Notes

References

External link

List
Marble
Marble
Building stone
Marble
Marble
Marble